Heinkenszand is a town in the Dutch province of Zeeland. It is a part of the municipality of Borsele, and lies about 14 km east of Middelburg.

History 
The village was first mentioned in 1351 as Heynekijnssand, and means "sand of Heynekijn (Hendrik)". Heinkenszand is a dike village which is located between the Oosterlandpolder and the Oosterguitepolder.

The Dutch Reformed church is an aisleless church with built-in tower which was built in 1844 to replace its medieval predecessor. The spire dates from 1932. The Catholic St Blasius Church was built between 1864 and 1866 on the location of the former Barbestein castle, and has a twin tower.

The estate Watervliet was built around 1588 on the location of another former castle. It was demolished in 1793 and replaced by estate Bloemenheuvel which in turn was demolished in 1895. The current estate Landlust probably started as a farm in 1793 on the ground. It was extended into a hunting lodge in 1856.

Heinkenszand was home to 1,389 people in 1840. Heinkenszand was a separate municipality until 1970 when it was merged into Borsele.

Tourism
Heinkenszand has steadily been increasing its importance as a tourism destination with holiday park "Stelleplas" and a traditional wooden shoe factory and museum.

Gallery

References

Former municipalities of Zeeland
Populated places in Zeeland
Borsele